Simon Greul (born 13 April 1981) is a retired German male tennis player. His career high rank was No. 55, achieved on 22 March 2010.

Career

His major breakthrough was at the 2006 Nasdaq-100 Open, where after beating Adrián García and Ricardo Mello in the qualifying rounds, he reached the round of 16 at the main draw, defeating Paradorn Srichaphan, Dominik Hrbatý, and Tim Henman before succumbing to fourth seed Andy Roddick 6–3, 3–6, 6–2.

In 2009 he reached the quarterfinal at the German Open in Hamburg. He lost to Spaniard David Ferrer. At the 2009 US Open he defeated Giovanni Lapentti in the first round but lost to eventual finalist Roger Federer in the second round.
In his next tournament, the BCR Romania Open in Bucharest he reached the semifinal where he lost to Juan Mónaco.
Greul finished the season ranked No.59. The year was highlighted by a win at an ATP Challenger Tour Event in Todi, a semifinal appearance in Trani and Genoa.
It was the best season in his career earning $305,269 and a match record of 15–15 in ATP World Tour level.

In March 2010 Greul was nominated for the Davis Cup first round match against France. Greul defeated Jo-Wilfried Tsonga in a dead rubber. That was Germany's only win in this tie.
Greul reached his career high ranking of #55 after advancing to the third round of the 2010 BNP Paribas Open in Indian Wells after beating Richard Gasquet and Gaël Monfils. This was followed by a first round exit at the 2010 Sony Ericsson Open in Miami. At the 2010 BMW Open in Munich he was defeated by Marin Čilić in the second round after leading 4:1 in the deciding set. He reached the quarterfinal at the 2010 Ordina Open in s´Hertogenbosch and at the Mercedes Cup in Stuttgart. He could not defend the quarterfinal points in Hamburg of the season before which meant a drop in the ranking. At the BCR Romania Open he was knocked out in the second round by Juan Ignacio Chela.

Doubles: 1 (1 runner-up)

ATP Challenger and ITF Futures finals

Singles: 30 (20–10)

Doubles: 15 (5–10)

Performance timelines

Singles

External links 
 
 
 Greul world ranking history

German male tennis players
Sportspeople from Stuttgart
1981 births
Living people
Tennis people from Baden-Württemberg